Ice hockey is a minor sport in Mexico, but is slowly growing. Football (soccer) have dominated Mexican sports for decades, but ice hockey has still not been popular in Mexico since its founding in the 1960s.

Women's ice hockey is also growing in Mexico.

History
The game of ice hockey was played in the country for the first time in the 1960s, however the Mexican Federation of Winter Sports was not founded until 1984. Mexico joined the International Ice Hockey Federation (IIHF) on 30 April 1985. It is the third North American nation after Canada and the United States to join the IIHF.

Domestic league
The Mexican Elite Hockey League is a semi-professional ice hockey league in Mexico and was inaugurated as the Mexican Elite League on 2 October 2010, with the goal to establishing Mexico's high-level international competitor in ice hockey. Currently it has four professional teams and 17 associated equipment.

National teams
The men's national team played its first game on 10 April 2000 during the 2000 World Championship Pool D tournament in Reykjavík, Iceland, losing to Belgium 5–0. It is the only Latin American team that competes in the IIHF tournaments.

The women's national team played its first game on 18 February 2012 against Argentina in an exhibition game in Cuautitlán Izcalli, losing to them 1–0. The following day, they played the Argentinians again, this time winning by a score of 7–1. The women's national team have not competed in any Women's World Championship tournaments until 2014, they played in Division II Group B Qualification tournament. They won all three of their games and earning a promotion to Division II Group B for 2015.

The junior national team played its first game on 30 December 1996 during the 1997 World Junior Championship Pool D tournament in Sofia, Bulgaria, in a 13–1 loss to Spain.

Mexico City hosted the Pan American Tournament from 2014–2017. The men's national team was the runners-up three times until 2017, they won their first ever Pan American Tournament by defeating Colombia 1–0 in the final, however their opposition is currently not a member of the IIHF due to lack of governing bodies of ice hockey in Colombia.

Olympic games
On 15 January 2020, Luisa Wilson became the first Mexican to win an Olympic medal in any Winter Olympics sport when her team won the gold medal at the girls' 3x3 mixed tournament, during the 2020 Winter Youth Olympics in Lausanne, Switzerland.

References